Laird is a surname and a Scottish title.  Notable persons with that surname include: 

Alexander Laird (1797–1873), Scottish-Canadian farmer and politician
Anne Laird (born 1970), Scottish curler
Bruce Laird (American football) (born 1950), American football player
Bruce Laird (born 1950), Australian cricketer
Carobeth Laird (1895–1983), American anthropologist
Charlton Laird (1901–1984), American linguist and lexicographer
Chris Laird (born 1893),  Australian rules footballer 
David Laird (1833–1914), Canadian politician; Lieutenant Governor of Northwest Territories
Davie Laird (born 1936), Scottish footballer
Dean S. Laird (1921–2022) WWII U.S. Navy ace
Elizabeth Laird (author) (born 1943), British writer of children's books
Elizabeth Laird (physicist) (1874–1969), Canadian physicist
Emma Laird (born 1998), British actress
Emil Matthew Laird (1896–1982), American aircraft builder and pilot
Flake Laird (1902–1992), American college sports coach
Gavin Laird (1933–2017), Scottish trade unionist
Gerald Laird (born 1979), American baseball player
Helen Laird (1874–1957), Irish actress also known as ‘Honor Lavelle’, a costumier, teacher, and feminist
Helen M. Laird (1931–2020), electron-microscopist 
Henry Laird (1868–1940), Canadian journalist, merchant and politician
Jack Laird (potter) (1920–2009), New Zealand potter
Jack Laird (1923–1991), American television producer, writer, director and actor
James Laird (politician) (1849–1889), American politician; U.S. representative from Nebraska
Jenny Laird (1912–2001), British film and television actress
John Laird (disambiguation)
Luke Laird (born c. 1978), American songwriter
Macgregor Laird (1808–1861), Scottish merchant pioneer on the Niger River
Marc Laird (born 1986), Scottish football player
Margaret B. Laird (1871–1968), American women's suffrage leader
Margaret Heather Laird (1933–2014), British teacher and senior laywoman in the Church of England
Margaret Nicholl Laird (1897–1983), American Baptist missionary
Martin Laird (born 1982), Scottish professional golfer
Martina Laird (born 1971), Trinidadian actress, director and acting teacher
Matthew Laird (born 1977), Canadian politician from British Columbia and author
Melvin R. Laird, Sr. (1877–1946), American politician, businessman and clergyman
Melvin R. Laird (1922-2016), American congressman and Secretary of Defense
Mike Laird (born 1974), American BMX rider
Nan Laird, American professor of biostatistics
Nick Laird (born 1975), Northern Ireland novelist and poet
Norman Laird (1906–1970), Northern Ireland doctor and politician
Patrick Laird (born 1995), American football player
Paul Laird (born 1958), American musicologist
Peter Laird (born 1954), American comic book artist
Philip Johnson-Laird (born 1936), American psychologist and author
Ray A. Laird (1907–1986), American educator and president of Laredo College
Rick Laird (1941–2021), Irish jazz musician
Robbin Laird (born 1946), American military and defense analyst
Ron Laird (born 1938), American race walker
Rory Laird (born 1993), Australian rules football player
Ryan Laird (born 1984), Canadian country music singer-songwriter
Sally Laird (1956–2010), British editor and translator of Russian literature
Sandy Laird (1901–?), Scottish footballer
Scott Laird (born 1988), English football player
Stephen Laird (fl. 20th century), American journalist; alleged to be a Soviet spy in the 1930s
Stu Laird (born 1960), Canadian Football League player
Susan Laird (1908–1933), American competition swimmer 
Trevor Laird (born 1957), English actor
Walter Laird (1920–2002), British Latin-American dancer
William Laird (disambiguation)
Willie Laird (20th century), Scottish association football player

Alternate spellings
In the United States, the surname Laird has many different spellings, presumably due to oral census takers.

References

Scottish surnames